Keldonk is a village in the south of the Netherlands. It is situated in the municipality of Meierijstad, North Brabant. 

Keldonk was home to 246 people in 1840. In 1912, the St. Anthony of Padua Church was built. Until the municipal reorganization of 1994, Keldonk was located in the municipality of Erp. In 2017, it became part of Meierijstad.

Gallery

References

External links
 Official website of Keldonk

Populated places in North Brabant
Meierijstad